Anthidium danieli is a species of bee in the family Megachilidae, the leaf-cutter, carder bee, or mason bees.

Distribution
Argentina

References

danieli
Insects described in 2001